Hoeksche Waard is a municipality in the western Netherlands, in the province of South Holland, consisting of the eponymous Hoeksche Waard and Tiengemeten islands.

The municipality was formed on 1 January 2019 by the merger of the municipalities Binnenmaas, Cromstrijen, Korendijk, Oud-Beijerland, and Strijen.

Gallery

Notable people 

 Lamoral, Count of Egmont (1522–1568) a general and statesman, Lord of Oud-Beijerland 
 Philip, Count of Egmont (1558 – 1590) the fifth Count of Egmont and Lord of Oud-Beijerland
 Thomas van der Wilt (1659 in Piershil – 1733) a Dutch painter
 Philip van Dijk (1683 in Oud-Beijerland – 1753) a Dutch painter
 Stoffel Muller (1776 in Puttershoek – 1833) leader of a small Dutch Protestant sect Zwijndrechtse nieuwlichters
 Suze Groeneweg (born 1875 in Strijensas - 1940) a Dutch politician, the first woman to be elected to the Dutch parliament
 Renée Jones-Bos (born 1952 in Oud-Beijerland) a Dutch senior civil servant and diplomat 
 Ineke Dezentjé Hamming-Bluemink (born 1954) a former Dutch politician and municipal councillor in Cromstrijen
 Anton Corbijn (born 1955 in Strijen) a Dutch photographer, music video director and film director  
 Eibert Tigchelaar (born 1959 in Sint Anthoniepolder) academic and expert on the Dead Sea Scrolls
 Carlo Resoort (born 1973 in Numansdorp) a Dutch DJ, remixer and producer; plays with the 4 Strings
 Benno de Goeij (born 1975 in Oud-Beijerland) a Dutch record producer, works with Armin van Buuren  
 Vivienne van den Assem  (born 1983) a Dutch actress and presenter, brought up in Oud-Beijerland

Sport 

 Nijs Korevaar (1927 in Mijnsheerenland – 2016) a Dutch water polo player, team bronze medallist at the 1948 Summer Olympics
 Kees Verkerk (born 1942 in Maasdam) a former speed skater, three time winter Olympic silver medallist and gold medallist at the 1968 Winter Olympics
 Adri van Tiggelen (born 1957 in Oud-Beijerland) a retired Dutch footballer with 505 club caps 
 Ria Visser (born 1961 in Oud-Beijerland) a former ice speed skater and silver medallist at the 1980 Winter Olympics 
 Kristie Boogert (born 1973 in Oud-Beijerland) a former professional female tennis player and team silver medallist at the 2000 Summer Olympics

References

External links

Official website

 
Municipalities of South Holland
Municipalities of the Netherlands established in 2019